Chaldean language may refer to:

 Ancient Chaldean language, language of Ancient Chaldeans
 Chaldean language (misnomer), former misnomer for Biblical Aramaic language
 Chaldean Neo-Aramaic, a name for the Suret language as used by the Chaldean Catholic Church

See also
 Chaldean (disambiguation)